The Chennai Egmore–Tuticorin Link Express is an Express train belonging to Southern Railway zone that runs between  and  in India. It is currently being operated with 16129/16130 train numbers on a daily basis. It is also called Koodal Express or Kudal Express.

Service

The 16129/Chennai Egmore–Tuticorin Link Express has an average speed of 53 km/hr and covers 652 km in 12h 15m. The 16130/Tuticorin–Chennai Egmore Link Express has an average speed of  51 km/hr and covers 652 km in 12h 45m.

Route and halts 

The important halts of the train are:

Coach composition

The train has standard ICF rakes with a max speed of 110 kmph. The train consists of 6 coaches:

 4 second sitting
 1 general unreserved
 2 seating cum luggage rake

Traction

Both trains are hauled by an Erode Loco Shed-based WAP-4 electric locomotive from Chennai to Tuticorin and vice versa.

Rake sharing

The trains are attached/detached from/to Guruvayur Express at Vanchi Maniyachchi. From Chennai Egmore to Vanchi Maniyachi and vice versa the train will run coupled with Guruvayur Express. A separate loco will haul the train from Vanchi Maniyachi to Tuticorin and vice versa.

See also 

 Chennai Egmore railway station
 Tuticorin railway station
 Coimbatore–Tuticorin Link Express

Notes

References

External links 

 16129/Chennai Egmore–Tuticorin Link Express India Rail Info
 16130/Tuticorin–Chennai Egmore Link Express India Rail Info

Transport in Chennai
Transport in Thoothukudi
Express trains in India
Rail transport in Tamil Nadu
Railway services introduced in 2013